Lincoln is a major media center in Nebraska. The following is a list of media outlets based in the city.

Print

Newspapers
The Lincoln Journal Star is the city's primary newspaper, published daily.  Other newspapers published in Lincoln include:
 Clocktower, Union College student paper
 Daily Nebraskan, University of Nebraska–Lincoln student paper, daily
 The Dailyer Nebraskan, University of Nebraska–Lincoln satirical student paper, bi-weekly

Radio
In its Fall 2013 ranking of radio markets by population, Arbitron ranked Lincoln 168th in the United States. Due to Lincoln's proximity to Omaha, local listeners can also receive the signal of several radio stations broadcasting from the Omaha radio market.

The following is a list of radio stations licensed to and/or broadcasting from Lincoln:

AM

FM

Television
Lincoln is a principal city of the Lincoln-Hastings-Kearney television market. The market includes the central portion of Nebraska as well as several counties in north-central Kansas. Due to Lincoln's proximity to Omaha, local viewers can also receive the signal of most television stations broadcasting in the Omaha television market.

The following is a list of television stations that broadcast from and/or are licensed to the city.

References

Lincoln
Mass media in Nebraska